ITI CD is the second album to be released by the Polish band Ich Troje, in 1997.

The track "Mandy" is a Polish-language cover of the Barry Manilow song of the same name.

Track listing 
 "Drzwi"
 "Loop"
 "Lustro"
 "Spowiedź"
 "Les"
 "S.o.s"
 "Gwiezdna noc"
 "Miłość i zdrada"
 "Sam"
 "Koniec"
 "Mnie to wali"
 "Jastrzębia profil"
 "Wznieś mnie"
 "Dąbrowa"
 "Mandy"

Ich Troje albums
1997 albums